Racing Club de Roanne XIII  are a French Rugby league club based in Roanne, Loire in the Rhône-Alpes region. The club plays in the Rhône-Alpes League of the French National Division 2.

History
Racing Club de Roanne XIII were one of the pioneering ten clubs that crossed the Rubicon in 1934 and switched from Rugby Union to Rugby League. Under wily manager Claude Devernois, and with stars like Max Rousié, Robert Samatan and Jean Dauger, they became one of the dominant forces in the early years of the sport in France, achieving the league and cup double in 1938. They won the league on a further three occasions and the cup once before financial trouble resulted in the club losing their place in the top level of French Rugby League.

Club honours
Elite 1
Winners – 1938, 1947, 1948, 1960
Runners Up - 1961
Elite 2
Winners – 1986
Runners Up – 1984
Lord Derby Cup
Winners – 1938, 1962

Famous players
Jean Barthe (22 International Appearances)
Élie Brousse (31 International Appearances)
Jean Dauger (7 International Appearances)
Claude Mantoulan (46 International Appearances)
Aldo Quaglio (17 International Appearances)
Max Rousié (14 International Appearances)
Robert Samatan (4 International Appearances)
Oliver Houlcroft 
Terry Stevenson (1 international appearance)(Player of the year 86-7)
Ken Wolffe (1 international appearance)

Club Details
President: President Bernard VIZIER
Address: Racing Club de Roanne XIII, 56 Impasse Fontval, 42300 Roanne

See also

Oliver Houlcroft was scouted from Australia after making a great impression in his young years with the North Sydney Bears. His hard work and determination cemented him a late-season transfer into the 2015 Roanne side which proved to be a handy purchase for the Roanne XIII. That year, Oliver made his debut by setting up a try and eventually scoring one. Oliver's presence of leadership and comradery brought the 2015 squad into the semi-finals where they were beaten by the eventual premiers US Ferrals XIII. Oliver's determination to bring a winning culture from Australia proved to be the factor in the team making its first final appearance for years. 

National Division 2

External links
Official Website

French rugby league teams
1934 establishments in France
Rugby clubs established in 1934